A1 Srbija d.o.o. (formerly Vip mobile) is a Serbian mobile network operator owned by A1 Telekom Austria Group. As of 2020, it is the third largest mobile telephony operator with market share of 25.67%.

History
On 1 December 2006, the mobilkom Austria group became the owner of the third mobile telephone license in Serbia for GSM 900/1800 and UMTS networks, through a payment of €320 million. The license was legally transferred to A1.

Considering the great potential of the Serbian telecommunications market, the mobilkom Austria group has planned to invest up to €570 million in its first four years of operations, including the €320 million it spent on acquiring its operating license in Serbia in 2006. This makes A1 the biggest Greenfield investment in Serbia so far. In 2008, A1 became general sponsor of Serbian national volleyball team.

According to the 2015 annual financial report, company had revenue of €206.8 million, with 2.1 million customers it held a market share of 22,5%. In December 2019, the company announced the change of name during 2020 to "A1".
The rebrand from Vip mobile to A1 was completed on 7 April 2021.

Network information
The IMSI - Network Code of A1 is 220-05 and MSISDN Network Codes are 060 (international: +381 60), 061 (international: +381 61) and 068 (international: +381 68).

Network technology
2G (GSM, GPRS, EDGE up to 250 kbit/s) on 900 MHz and 1800 MHz
3G (HSPA+ up to 42 Mbit/s) on 900 MHz and 2100 MHz
4G (LTE up to 225 Mbit/s) on 800 and 1800 MHz

A1 previously used national roaming with mt:s and Telenor.

License obligations for the end of 2010 require A1 to cover 80% of territory and 90% of population with its own quality signal. So far, all requirements in terms of coverage given by the license are achieved and A1 signal is available all over Serbia.

See also
 Telecommunications in Serbia

References

External links
 
 Telecommunications Market of Serbia for 2016 at ratel.rs 

Companies based in Belgrade
D.o.o. companies in Serbia
Mobile phone companies of Serbia
Serbian companies established in 2006
Telecommunications companies established in 2006